Heri Susanto (born 15 July 1994) is an Indonesian professional footballer who plays as a winger for Liga 1 club Persita Tangerang.

Club career

Persiba Balikpapan
Heri made his debut against Arema FC in the first week 2016 Indonesia Soccer Championship A, that time, Heri as a substitute. His first goal when he scored against Bali United F.C. in the fifth week. 

On ninth week, against Persegres Gresik United, Heri added a collection of his goal. In the second half was just five minutes, Heri Susanto scored when  Persiba against Persegres Gresik United. Heri brought a win 5-3 over Gresik United

PSM Makassar
He was signed for PSM Makassar to play in Liga 1 in the 2018 season. Heri Susanto made his league debut on 4 June 2018 against Persipura Jayapura at the Mandala Stadium, Jayapura.

Persija Jakarta
In 2019, Susanto signed a contract with Indonesian Liga 1 club Persija Jakarta. Susanto made his first Liga 1 appearance on 20 May 2019, coming on as a substitute in a 1–1 draw with Barito Putera at the 17th May Stadium.

Persis Solo
On 31 May 2021, Susanto signed one-year contract with Liga 2 club Persis Solo, he joined the club with his friend while still in Persija, Sandi Sute. Susanto made his first 2021–22 Liga 2 debut on 26 September 2021, coming on as a substitute in a 2–0 win with PSG Pati at the Manahan Stadium, Surakarta.

Persita Tengerang
Susanto was signed for Persita Tangerang to play in Liga 1 in the 2022–23 season. He made his league debut on 25 July 2022 in a match against Persik Kediri at the Indomilk Arena, Tangerang.

Career statistics

Club

Honours

Club

Persija Jakarta
Menpora Cup: 2021
Persis Solo
 Liga 2: 2021

References

External links
Heri Susanto at flashscore.co.id

Living people
1994 births
Indonesian footballers
People from Magelang
Sportspeople from Central Java
Liga 1 (Indonesia) players
Liga 2 (Indonesia) players
Pelita Bandung Raya players
Persiba Balikpapan players
PSM Makassar players
Persija Jakarta players
Persis Solo players
Persita Tangerang players
Association football forwards
Association football wingers